Aceh earthquake may refer to:

2012 Aceh earthquake, magnitude 8.6 and 8.2  undersea earthquakes that struck near the Indonesian province of Aceh on April 11, 2012
2013 Aceh earthquake, magnitude 6.1 earthquake that struck the province of Aceh on the Indonesian island of Sumatra on July 2, 2013
2016 Aceh earthquake, magnitude 6.5 earthquake that struck the regency of Bireun, Pidie, and Pidie Jaya of Aceh on December 7, 2016

See also
List of earthquakes in Indonesia